Pogamasing station is a Via Rail flag stop station located in Pogamasing, Ontario, Canada on the Sudbury – White River train.

External links
Via Rail page for Pogamasing train station

Via Rail stations in Ontario
Railway stations in Sudbury District